Aquimarina longa  is a  Gram-negative, strictly aerobic and rod-shaped bacterium from the genus of Aquimarina which has been isolated from seawater from the South Pacific Gyre.

References

External links
Type strain of Aquimarina longa at BacDive -  the Bacterial Diversity Metadatabase

Flavobacteria
Bacteria described in 2013